Events from the year 1994 in France.

Incumbents
 President: François Mitterrand
 Prime Minister: Édouard Balladur

Events
20 March – Cantonales Elections held.
24 March – Cantonales Elections held.
20 April – Paul Touvier is found guilty of ordering the execution of seven Jews at Rillieux-la-Pape in June 1944, becoming the first French national to be charged with crimes against humanity committed during the German occupation of France in the Second World War.
6 May – The Channel Tunnel is opened by President François Mitterrand and Elizabeth II in two separate ceremonies held in Calais and Folkestone.  
12 June – European Parliament election held in France.
30 June – Airbus A330 test flight crash in Toulouse, killing 3 crew and 4 passengers.
4 August – Toubon Law enacted.
3 November – A French magazine publishes photo of President François Mitterrand's secret daughter.
13 November – The first passengers travel through the Channel Tunnel.
7 December – L'étrange Noël de monsieur Jack on French Movie Theater
24 December – Air France Flight 8969 is hijacked in Algiers airport.
26 December – Air France aircraft is flown to Marseille and stormed by the GIGN, 4 hijackers and 3 others were killed.

Arts and literature

Sport
2 July – Tour de France begins. Two stages take place in England.
3 July – Michael Schumacher wins the French Grand Prix held at the Circuit de Nevers Magny-Cours.
24 July – Tour de France ends, won by Miguel Indurain of Spain.

Births
19 January – Adrien Hunou, footballer
23 January – Wesley Jobello, footballer
13 February – Axel Reymond, Marathon swimmer
3 March – Abdoulaye Touré, footballer.
27 May – Aymeric Laporte, footballer
13 June – Guy-Elphège Anouman, sprinter
14 June – Romain Habran, footballer.
17 July – Benjamin Mendy, footballer
3 August – Corentin Tolisso, footballer
17 August – Tiémoué Bakayoko, footballer
15 September – Raphael Severe, clarinet player.
27 October – Kurt Zouma, footballer
8 November – Damien Dussaut, footballer.

Deaths

January to March
2 January – Pierre-Paul Schweitzer, fourth managing director of the International Monetary Fund (born 1912).
15 January – Gabriel-Marie Garrone, cardinal (born 1901).
22 January – Jean-Louis Barrault, actor, director and mime artist (born 1910).
24 January – Yves Navarre, writer (born 1940).
27 January – Alain Daniélou, historian, musicologist and Indologist (born 1907).
30 January – Pierre Boulle, novelist (born 1912).
11 February – Max Leognany, artist (born 1913).
16 February – François Marty, Roman Catholic crdinal (born 1904).
24 February – Jean Sablon, singer and actor (born 1906).
9 March – Paul Dubreil, mathematician (born 1904).
28 March – Eugène Ionesco, Romanian-born playwright (born 1909).
31 March – Henri Gouhier, philosopher, historian of philosophy and literary critic (born 1898).

April to June
1 April – Robert Doisneau, photographer (born 1912).
3 April – Jérôme Lejeune, paediatrician and geneticist (born 1926).
9 April – Marcel Ichac, alpinist, explorer, photographer and film director (born 1906).
14 April – Jean Joyet, painter (born 1919).
17 April – Gaston Charlot, chemist (born 1904).
20 April – Jean Carmet, actor (born 1920).
29 April – Marcel Bernard, tennis player (born 1914).
16 May – Alain Cuny, actor (born 1908).
19 May – Jacques Ellul, philosopher, sociologist, theologian (born 1912).
3 June – Puig Aubert, rugby league footballer (born 1925).
14 June – Marcel Mouloudji, singer and actor (born 1922).
16 June – Bernard Moitessier, yachtsman and author (born 1925).
27 June – Jacques Berthier, composer (born 1923).

July to September
8 July – Christian-Jaque, filmmaker (born 1904).
17 July – Jean Borotra, tennis player (born 1898).
19 August – Louis de Froment, conductor (born 1921).
16 September – Albert Decourtray, Roman Catholic cardinal (born 1923).
23 September – Madeleine Renaud, actress (born 1900).
30 September – André Michel Lwoff, microbiologist, awarded Nobel Prize in Medicine in 1965 (born 1902).

October to December
15 October – Jean Dasté, actor and theatre director (born 1904).
21 October – Benoît Régent, actor (born 1953).
30 November
Guy Debord, Marxist theorist, writer and filmmaker (born 1931).
Louis Gabrillargues, soccer player (born 1914).
7 December – Pierre Cloarec, cyclist (born 1909).
13 December – Antoine Pinay, politician and Prime Minister of France (born 1891).
18 December – Roger Apéry, mathematician (born 1916).
25 December – Pierre Dreyfus, civil servant and businessman (born 1907).

Full date unknown
Raymond Molinier, Trotskyist (born 1904).

See also
 List of French films of 1994

References

1990s in France